Lorraine is an unincorporated area located in Manatee County, Florida.

History 
The small company town of Lorraine was established by the Lorraine Turpentine Company. Both were created in 1915 by Tampa financier G.A. McLeod. The company became a public corporation in 1916. Both company and town were likely named after the region of Lorraine in France, which dominated national news during this time. A nearby community where the Lorraine Turpentine Company also operated is similarly named Alsace. In addition to being home to a turpentine mill, Lorraine was also the location of a saw mill owned by Schroeder Mill & Timber Company.

By the mid-1920s, the turpentine industry in the area began drying up and The Lorraine Turpentine Company lost the land in a government seizure due to their indebtedness. A significant area of Lorraine remained in the ownership of Schroeder Mill & Timber Company. In 1926, Lorraine Farms, a community of multi-acre farmable plots was platted at Lorraine.

Since the 1990s, Lorraine has been considered part of greater Lakewood Ranch, a planned community located on former Shroeder-Manatee Ranch land.

References

Unincorporated communities in Manatee County, Florida
Unincorporated communities in Florida